Lena Rivers, aka The Sin of Lena Rivers, is a 1932 American pre-Code drama film directed by Phil Rosen based on the 1856 novel by Mary Jane Holmes. Filmed on several occasions throughout the silent era.

Plot
Lena's mother dies at her birth, and she is raised by her grandparents, Mr. and Mrs. Nichols. Lena has never known her father. When she is a teenager, Mr. Nichols dies and Lena and her grandmother go to live with her uncle and the son of the grandmother in Kentucky. John's wife, Matilda, is not at all happy about their coming, and holds it against Lena that she was born out of wedlock. John's daughter, Caroline, thinks Lena is "common" and doesn't include her socially. Upon their arrival, they meet a neighbor, Mr. Graham, who takes an obvious interest in Lena.

Mr. Graham, while showing Lena his horses, explains to her that she reminds him of a girl he was in love with a long time ago. But he lost that girl, while he was away, because she thought he had left her. Lena discovers she has a natural affinity with horses when she is able to calm a frisky horse, Brimstone. Mr. Graham gives Brimstone to Lena. Lena becomes friends with Mr. Graham's ward, Durrie.

Mr. Graham and Lena become good friends, and it turns out that Mr. Graham is Lena's father. He is afraid to tell her, because Lena has learned to hate the father she's never known. In order to help her financially, Mr. Graham fixes a race so that Brimstone wins. Lena's grandmother dies, leaving Lena feel all alone. Conflicts are resolved and happy endings prevail.

Cast
Charlotte Henry - Lena Rivers
Morgan Galloway - Durrie Belmont
Beryl Mercer - Grandmother Nichols
James Kirkwood - Henry R. Graham
John St. Polis - John Nichols
Betty Blythe - Mrs. Mathilda Nichols
Joyce Compton - Caroline Nichols
Russell Simpson - Grandfather Nichols
Clarence Muse - Curfew
John Larkin - Lucifer 'Lucy' Jones
The Kentucky Singers - Choir Singers (*Kentucky Jubilee Singers)

References

External links
 

1932 films
Films based on American novels
Films directed by Phil Rosen
Tiffany Pictures films
1932 drama films
American drama films
American black-and-white films
1930s American films
1930s English-language films